Frank Charles "Chick" Genovese (November 23, 1914 – February 12, 1981) was an American professional baseball player, manager and scout. He managed six different teams within the New York Giants farm system from 1949 to 1956, and worked as a scout for many years.

While managing the Giants' Class B farm team in Trenton in 1950, Genovese became the first professional manager of Willie Mays, and taught Mays his famous basket catch.  Genovese was also credited with scouting and signing players including Felipe, Matty, and Jesús Alou, Juan Marichal, Tito Fuentes, and Manny Mota.

In 1954 he was the co-manager with Austin Knickerbocker of the Olean Giants, a minor league team affiliated with the New York Giants. The team had been known locally as the Olean Oilers in the Pennsylvania–Ontario–New York League  and played their home games at Bradner Stadium in Olean, New York. He married Edith Broughton (b. 1918).

His brother George Genovese was also in baseball, as a player, minor league manager, and scout.

Chick Genovese died at age 66 on February 12, 1981, in Orlando, Florida.

Genovese was inducted into the Staten Island Sports Hall of Fame in 2005.

See also

References

External links
New York Minor League City Encyclopedia
"Chick" Genovese-stats and picture

This article is based on the "Olean Oilers" article at Baseball-Reference.com Bullpen. The Bullpen is a wiki, and its content is available under the GNU Free Documentation License.

1914 births
1981 deaths
Canton Terriers players
Hazleton Red Sox players
Knoxville Smokies players
Louisville Colonels (minor league) players
Minneapolis Millers (baseball) managers
Minneapolis Millers (baseball) players
New York Giants (NL) scouts
Olean Oilers managers
Oneonta Indians players
Rocky Mount Red Sox players
San Francisco Giants scouts
Scranton Red Sox players
Sportspeople from Staten Island
Baseball players from New York City
American expatriate baseball people in the Dominican Republic